Sechele is a village in the  North-East District of Botswana. The population in 2001 was 668. The population in 2011 was 528.

References

Villages in Botswana
North-East District (Botswana)